The Amber Mountain rock thrush (Monticola erythronotus) is a songbird in the family Muscicapidae. It was formerly considered as a subspecies of the forest rock thrush (Monticola sharpei).

Distribution
The Amber Mountain rock thrush is endemic to Madagascar where it occurs only on the Amber Mountain massif in the north of the island.

Description
Males have blue hoods, chestnut upperparts, bright orange tail with brown central feathers and orange underparts. Females are mostly brown with an orange wash on the underparts and lack the blue hood. Males are distinguished from other rock-thrushes by the dark rufous back, while the females have bright orange tails and lack white streaking on the breast.

Habitat and ecology
The species nests in tree hollows or in crevices under overhangs.

Conservation status
The Amber Mountain rock thrush is listed by the International Union for Conservation of Nature and Natural Resources as Endangered because it has a very small range and its forest habitat is declining in both area and quality. The population is small and believed to be declining, albeit slowly. The total population of this species is estimated to number less than 5,000 individuals, which occur in a single block of forest in the Amber Mountain National Park. It may be declining, although so far there has been relatively low levels of habitat loss in the area of its occurrence.

Taxonomic notes
The Amber Mountain rock thrush has been regarded as a separate species but this view is in doubt. It had been split from the forest rock thrush because of a variety of morphological differences and in spite of an absence of genetic distinctiveness. As the forest rock thrush and Benson's rock thrush have been lumped into Monticola sharpei this taxon has followed suit.

References

External links 

Amber Mountain rock thrush
Endemic birds of Madagascar
Amber Mountain rock thrush
Taxonomy articles created by Polbot